Surkhon Termez is an Uzbek professional football club based in the city of Termez. It was founded in 1968.

History

Domestic history

Managers

Players

Notable players
  Abdusamad Durmonov 
  Vladimir Grishchenko 
  Rustam Durmonov 
  Vladimir Gryngazov 
  Marat Kabaev 
  Vladimir Dergach 
  Nikolay Maslov 
  Gennady Mikhaylutsa 
  
  Yuri Sargsyan 
  Asan Mustafayev 
  Albert Tsaraev 
  Dougllas Nacsimento Do Trugilho
  Lucas Oliveria De Cunha
  Darko Stanojević
  Vladimir Bubanja
  Oleksandr Kasyan

References 

Football clubs in Uzbekistan
Association football clubs established in 1968
Surkhon Termez